Danuta Kozák (born 11 January 1987) is a Hungarian sprint canoeist. She has won one silver, one bronze and six Olympic gold medals, three of which in Rio de Janeiro in 2016, making her the only female to win K1, K2 and K4 at the same Olympics. At the 2020 Summer Olympics, she won a gold medal in  Women's K-4 500 metres, and bronze medal in Women's K-2 500 metres.

Career
Kozák has competed since the late 2000s. She won a silver medal in the K-4 500 m event at the 2008 Summer Olympics in Beijing.  Kozák then won a gold medal at the London Olympics in the Kayak Four (K4) 500m team event with Gabriella Szabó, Katalin Kovács and Krisztina Fazekas Zur for Hungary. She also won the gold medal in the Kayak Single (K1) 500m. She won three gold medals in the Kayak Single (K1) 500m, Kayak Pairs (K2) 500m and Kayak Four (K4) 500m at the Rio de Janeiro Olympics; a feat compounded with her reeling from a stomach infection one day before the events. The latter results made her the most successful Hungarian sprint canoer and the only female athlete to win K1, K2 and K4 at the same Olympics.

Kozák has also won eighteen medals at the ICF Canoe Sprint World Championships with fourteen golds (K-1 500 m: 2013, 2014, 2018; K-2 200 m: 2011; K-2 500 m: 2009, 2010, 2015, 2018; K-4 500 m: 2009, 2011, 2013, 2014, 2018 and K-1 200 m relay: 2013), two silvers (K-1 500 m: 2011 and K-4 500 m: 2015) and two bronzes (K-1 500 m: 2019, K-2 1000 m: 2007).

Awards
 Junior Príma award (2008)
 KSI SE – Athlete of Year (2008)
 Hungarian kayaker of the Year (5): 2011, 2012, 2013, 2014, 2016
 Perpetual champion of Hungarian Kayak-Canoe (2011)
 Honorary Citizen of Budapest (2012)
 Honorary Citizen of Újpest (2016)

Orders and special awards
  Order of Merit of the Republic of Hungary – Knight's Cross (2008)
   Order of Merit of Hungary – Officer's Cross (2012)
   Order of Merit of Hungary – Commander's Cross with Star (2016)

Personal life
Her mother is of Polish descent.

See also
List of multiple Olympic gold medalists

References

External links
 
 
 
 
 

1987 births
Living people
Canoeists from Budapest
Canoeists at the 2008 Summer Olympics
Canoeists at the 2012 Summer Olympics
Canoeists at the 2016 Summer Olympics
Canoeists at the 2020 Summer Olympics
Hungarian female canoeists
Hungarian people of Polish descent
Olympic canoeists of Hungary
Olympic gold medalists for Hungary
Olympic silver medalists for Hungary
Olympic bronze medalists for Hungary
Olympic medalists in canoeing
ICF Canoe Sprint World Championships medalists in kayak
Medalists at the 2012 Summer Olympics
Medalists at the 2008 Summer Olympics
Medalists at the 2016 Summer Olympics
Medalists at the 2020 Summer Olympics
European Games medalists in canoeing
European Games gold medalists for Hungary
Canoeists at the 2015 European Games
European Games bronze medalists for Hungary
Canoeists at the 2019 European Games
European Games silver medalists for Hungary